Radbourne is a civil parish in the South Derbyshire district of Derbyshire, England.  The parish contains nine listed buildings that are recorded in the National Heritage List for England.  Of these, two are listed at Grade I, the highest of the three grades, and the others are at Grade II, the lowest grade.  The parish contains the village of Radbourne and the surrounding area.  The most important buildings are a church and a country house, both of which are listed at Grade I.  Apart from items in the garden of the country house and a bridge, all the other listed buildings are farmhouses.


Key

Buildings

References

Citations

Sources

 

Lists of listed buildings in Derbyshire